Princess Irina Nikolaïevna Orlova (March 1, 1918 – September 16, 1989) was the eldest child of Prince Nicholas Vladimirovich Orlov and his wife, Princess Nadejda Petrovna of Russia.

Her mother was among the Romanovs who escaped the Russian Revolution in 1919 aboard the British ship , aboard which Princess Irina was the youngest passenger.

She had one sister named Princess Xenia (aka Ksenija) Nikolaïevna Orlova (1921–1963).

Irina Orlova Nikolaievna married Baron Hans von Waldstatten (1918–1977) in Rome 27 March 1940. They divorced in 1946. They had one daughter:
 Elizabeth Baroness von Waldstatten (born 7 February 1944-)

After her divorce, Irina had a son named Alexis Nicolas Orlov. He was born 10 September 1947.

She married Anthony Adama Zylstra (1902–1982) in the Hague, the Netherlands on 8 January 1960.

She died on 16 September 1989 at age 71 at Villacerf, France.

Notes

References
 Zeepvat, Charlotte (2004). The Camera and the Tsars. Sutton Publishing. 
 The Romanovs: The Final Chapter (Random House, 1995) by Robert K. Massie,  and 

1918 births
1989 deaths
Russian princesses
Emigrants from the Russian Empire to France